Ramona Amy Hoh (born 1979) is a Canadian former para-alpine skier from Edmonton. She won a silver and a bronze medal at the 1994 Winter Paralympics, and a bronze medal at the 1998 Winter Paralympics.

Ramona Hoh was born without fingers on her right hand. She is an alumna of Dartmouth College and currently works as a molecular biologist at Stanford University, where she also received her Ph.D.

References

Paralympic alpine skiers of Canada
Dartmouth College alumni
Stanford University alumni
Stanford University faculty
1979 births
Living people
Medalists at the 1994 Winter Paralympics
Medalists at the 1998 Winter Paralympics
Alpine skiers at the 1998 Winter Paralympics
Alpine skiers at the 1994 Winter Paralympics
Paralympic bronze medalists for Canada
Paralympic silver medalists for Canada
Sportspeople from Edmonton
Canadian molecular biologists
Canadian emigrants to the United States
Canadian sportspeople of Chinese descent
Paralympic medalists in alpine skiing